Fayette County High School may refer to:

Fayette County High School (Alabama), Fayette, Alabama
Fayette County High School (Georgia), Fayetteville, Georgia